The UK Joint Expeditionary Force (JEF) is a United Kingdom-led expeditionary force which consists of Denmark, Finland, Estonia, Iceland, Latvia, Lithuania, the Netherlands, Sweden, and Norway. Eight of the countries are also members of NATO, with Finland and Sweden currently outside that alliance as their applications are pending ratification.

History

Creation
The JEF concept was first conceived in 2012 and announced by the then Chief of the Defence Staff, General Sir David Richards. The JEF arose from the Joint Rapid Reaction Force (JRRF) which disappeared as a result of the UK's focus on operations in Afghanistan and Iraq.

The multinational JEF was officially launched with the Letter of Intent as a NATO initiative at the September 2014 Wales Summit, subsumed under the new “Framework Nations Concept” rubric. Germany, the UK and Italy were to act as framework nations for groups of Allies coming together to work multi-nationally for the joint development of forces and capabilities required by NATO.

The United Kingdom element of the JEF consists of personnel and equipment from the Royal Navy, Royal Marines, British Army and Royal Air Force and is designed to provide greater levels of integration than previously achieved especially when combined with other nations' armed forces.

In September 2014, the British Defence Secretary Michael Fallon also announced the signature of a Letter of Intent between Denmark, Estonia, Latvia, Lithuania, the Netherlands, Norway and the United Kingdom, to establish the JEF so that it is fully operational before 2018.

In early October 2015, Swedish Defence Minister Peter Hultqvist said that he did not rule out Sweden joining the Joint Expeditionary Force, even though no formal process exists to do so at the moment, when he was summoned by the Riksdag to confirm if the government was engaged in formal talks to join the JEF without the knowledge of the parliament. On June 22nd 2017, the Swedish government confirmed that Sweden will be joining the Joint Expeditionary Force.

On November 30th 2015 in the UK 7 countries – UK, Denmark, Estonia, Latvia, Lithuania, the Netherlands, Norway – signed the contract for founding the JEF.

In 2017, Sweden and Finland joined the JEF.

On June 28th 2018, a comprehensive memorandum of understanding was signed amongst eight partner nations.

In April 2021, Iceland joined the JEF.

Activities and development since 2019

In 2019, a series of maritime exercises occurred amongst JEF nations, known as BALTIC PROTECTOR. Following a meeting of JEF Defence Ministers in London on April 3rd, the first military phase of BALTIC PROTECTOR took place May 24th to 4 June off Denmark. They practiced modern maritime warfare, including both land and sea training.

Danish, Dutch, Norwegian and UK forces worked together to increase interoperability and share tactical knowledge. In addition to maritime operations, marines and soldiers from across the exercising nations undertook urban warfare simulations, live firing and parachuting. While JEF is willing and able to act without other nations, they prepare to work alongside NATO, EU, UN and other allies. They also joined the US 2nd Fleet on their annual BALTOPS exercise, which formed Phase 2 of BALTIC PROTECTOR. From 9 to 23 June, JEF forces were in the seas off Germany and Sweden where they conducted a sea war exercise, including mine countermeasure operations, naval gunfire, beach reconnaissance and close air support. On conclusion of the BALTOPS phase, many participating ships sailed to Kiel, Germany, to take part in the Kielerwochen Festival (Kiel Week).

In the final phase, between 26 June and 8 July, amphibious exercises were undertaken in the Baltic area. To coincide with the final phase, Defence Ministers and Chiefs of Defence met to mark the achievements in the year since JEF was declared operational and set the ambition for the next four years.

On 20 April 2021, Ben Wallace, the British Secretary of State for Defence, and Sturla Sigurjónsson the Icelandic Ambassador to the United Kingdom signed a note of joining, leading Iceland to become the 10th member of the JEF.

In February 2022, the foreign ministers of the 10 JEF countries announced military drills (ground, air and navy) in northern Europe.

Requirements
The aim of the JEF is to create a UK military framework, focused around its existing high readiness capabilities, that its partners can join up with. While it is the UK's intention to fully integrate the UK's JEF partners’ contributions before 2018, the JEF is claimed to be able to deploy immediately if required. It is designed with the following requirements in mind: 
"a. act jointly and with allies, but able to act alone"
"b. be well equipped, but not tied to platforms"
"c. adapt as the environment changes"

Capabilities

The JEF is intended as a pool of high readiness, adaptable forces that is designed to enhance the UK's ability to respond rapidly, anywhere in the world, with like-minded allies, or on behalf of international organizations such as the UN or NATO. The UK's contribution will include the lead commando, airborne, armored, aviation, air and maritime task groups.

Speaking before the Royal United Services Institute, Sir David Richards outlined the specific applications that the capabilities of the Joint Expeditionary Force will allow:

"With the capability to ‘punch’ hard and not be a logistical or tactical drag on a coalition, we will be especially welcomed by our friends and feared by our enemies."

"JEF will be capable of projecting power with global effect and influence. Nowhere is more important to us than our friends in the Middle East and Gulf and in line with clear political intent we would expect, with other initiatives, for JEF elements to spend more time reassuring and deterring in that region."

International partners
Together with the British Armed Forces, the following nine nations may form part of the JEF as required.

 Denmark – Danish Defence
 Estonia – Estonian Defence Forces
 Finland – Finnish Defence Forces
 Iceland – Icelandic Armed Forces
 Latvia – Latvian National Armed Forces
 Lithuania – Lithuanian Armed Forces
 Netherlands – Armed forces of the Netherlands
 Norway – Norwegian Armed Forces
 Sweden – Swedish Armed Forces

See also
Allied Rapid Reaction Corps
Combined Joint Expeditionary Force
Foreign relations of the United Kingdom
Immediate Response Force
Joint Expeditionary Force (Maritime)
Joint Rapid Reaction Force
Northern Future Forum

References

External links
Defence chief signals major UK military presence in Gulf (theguardian.com)
Håkon Lunde Saxi, "The UK Joint Expeditionary Force (JEF)", IFS Insights, no. 5. Oslo: Norwegian Institute for Defence Studies (IFS), 2018. 6 pages
Håkon Lunde Saxi, "British and German initiatives for defence cooperation: the Joint Expeditionary Force and the Framework Nations Concept", Defence Studies 17, no. 2 (2017): 171–197
Richard Reeve, The UK's Joint Expeditionary Force, ORG Explains #10, London: Oxford Research Group, June 2019.

Military of the United Kingdom
Military units and formations of the United Kingdom
Expeditionary units and formations